Riley Weselowski (born February 24, 1985) is a Canadian former professional ice hockey defenceman who predominantly played in the ECHL. He is currently serving as an assistant coach with the Kansas City Mavericks of the ECHL.

Playing career
Weselowski made his professional debut with the Idaho Steelheads of the ECHL.  In 2009, during his second season, he moved to Rapid City Rush.  After six seasons with the Rush in the Central Hockey League and ECHL, Weselowski left the club as a free agent and signed a one-year contract with the Cincinnati Cyclones on September 17, 2015.

After spending the 2015–16 season with the Cyclones, he returned to Rapid City on July 27, 2016, extending his record as the longest tenured player in club history .

During his 11th professional year in the 2018–19 season, Weselowski left the Rush for a second time, after he was traded to the league leading Florida Everblades at the trade deadline on March 7, 2019. 

During the 2019–20 season, Weselowski joined the Wichita Thunder and served as the team's captain.

Awards and honours

References

External links

1985 births
Living people
Bemidji State Beavers men's ice hockey players
Canadian ice hockey defencemen
Cincinnati Cyclones (ECHL) players
Florida Everblades players
Idaho Steelheads (ECHL) players
Neepawa Natives players
Rapid City Rush players
Wichita Thunder players